Electric Lady Lab was a Danish elektro-pop duo made up of producer and songwriter Martin Bøge Pedersen and vocalist Stine Hjelm Jacobsen. Electric Lady Lab was founded in March 2009. Their debut album Flash! was released on 7 January 2011. The duo is part of the new wave of modern Danish dance music. Electric Lady Lab broke up in March 2016.

Career
The couple knew each other since the 1990s where they were attending the same school in Køge. Prior to Electric Lady Lab, Martin was alongside Jakob Weise Hellumpart part of the Danish pop duo The Loft, whereas Stine was part of the indie pop band NU with other band members being Peter Iversen, Lars Iversen and Morten Krog Helgesen.

Electric Lady Lab debuted with the single "It's Over Now" in November 2009, but got commercial breakthrough with "You & Me" released in June 2010 that sampled on "Rhythm Is a Dancer", a 1992 hit from the German eurodance group Snap!. The single has made it to #2 on the Hitlisten, the official Danish Singles Chart. It was also a hit in Norway, Germany, Switzerland and Austria.

September 2011 saw the release of "Touch Me", with sampling from a-ha's 1985 hit "The Sun Always Shines on TV". The song was composed with Johan Wohlert from The Storm and used the vocals of a-ha lead singer Morten Harket.

Discography

Albums

Singles

References

Danish musical groups
Musical groups established in 2009
2009 establishments in Denmark
Musical groups disestablished in 2016
2016 disestablishments in Denmark